The large moth family Gelechiidae contains the following genera:

Naera
Narthecoceros
Nealyda
Neochronistis
Neodactylota
Neofaculta
Neofriseria
Neolechia
Neopalpa
Neopatetris
Neoschema
Neotelphusa
Nesolechia
Nevadopalpa
Nothris
Numata
Nuntia

References

 Natural History Museum Lepidoptera genus database

Gelechiidae
Gelechiid